Rita Schwarzelühr-Sutter (born 13 October 1962) is a German politician of the Social Democratic Party (SPD) who serves as a member of the German  (the German federal parliament) and was Parliamentary State Secretary in Chancellor Angela Merkel's third (from 2013) and fourth (from 2018) cabinet. Since December 2021, Schwarzelühr-Sutter is Parliamentary State Secretary in Chancellor Olaf Scholz's first (from 2021) cabinet. She is an outspoken advocate and expert for sustainable development and nuclear safety, recognized both nationally and internationally.

Personal life and education
Schwarzelühr-Sutter was born on 13 October 1962 in Waldshut in Baden-Württemberg.
She studied Business Administration at the University of Freiburg and ETH Zurich, graduating in 1989.

She is married and has two children.

Political career

Career in state politics
Rita Schwarzelühr-Sutter joined the Social Democratic Party (SPD) in 1994 and has been a member of the executive board of the SPD party organization for Waldshut since 1995. Since 2001 she has been the chairwoman of the SPD constituency party for the district of Waldshut. She was a member of the municipal council of her home town of Lauchringen from 1999 to the end of 2013. Since 2004 she has also been a member of the district council of the rural district of Waldshut.

Since September 2007 she has been a member of  the SPD executive board in the state of Baden-Württemberg, and from 2008 to 2009 she headed the national SPD Executive Committee's working group on sustainable mobility.

Member of Parliament, 2005–present
In parliament, she has since served on the Committee on Transport (2005-2009), the  Committee on Food, Agriculture and Consumer Protection (2010-2012), and the Committee on Economic Affairs and Technology (2012-2013).

By 2007, Schwarzelühr-Sutter was reportedly being groomed by the SPD as a future leader. In the 2009 federal elections, she was placed at number 16 on the party list and narrowly missed re-election to the  but was automatically re-elected in 2010 as designated successor following the death of Hermann Scheer.

Schwarzelühr-Sutter was re-elected in the 2013 federal election. In the negotiations to form a Grand Coalition of the Chancellor Angela Merkel's Christian Democrats (CDU together with the Bavarian CSU) and the SPD following the elections, she was part of the SPD delegation in the working group on economic policy, led by Ilse Aigner and Hubertus Heil.

On 17 December 2013, Schwarzelühr-Sutter was appointed Parliamentary State Secretary at the Federal Ministry for the Environment, Nature Conservation, Building and Nuclear Safety in Merkel's third cabinet. In this capacity, she has represented successive ministers Barbara Hendricks (2013–2018) and Svenja Schulze (since 2018) in political and parliamentary affairs, particularly in her designated special areas of climate change mitigation, nuclear reactor safety, conservation, and the environment and health. She has led or been a member of German delegations on various topics, including the Small Islands Development Conference for Small Island Developing States (SIDS 2014), the conference of the treaty states of the Biodiversity Convention (UN-CBD COP-12), and negotiations on the 2030 Agenda for Sustainable Development. She represents Germany at the High-Level Political Forum for Sustainable Development (HLPF) held annually at the United Nations in New York City.

In addition, Schwarzelühr-Sutter served as deputy chairwoman of the German-Swiss Parliamentary Friendship Group from 2011 until 2017.

In the negotiations to form a coalition government under Merkel’s leadership following the 2017 federal elections, Schwarzelühr-Sutter was part of the working group on energy, climate protection and the environment, led by Hendricks, Armin Laschet and Georg Nüßlein.

Following the 2021 state elections in Baden-Württemberg, Schwarzelühr-Sutter was part of her party's delegation in negotiations with Minister-President Winfried Kretschmann's Alliance '90/Greens on a potential coalition government.

Other activities

Regulatory bodies
 Federal Network Agency for Electricity, Gas, Telecommunications, Posts and Railway (BNetzA), Member of the Rail Infrastructure Advisory Council (2005-2009)

Corporate boards
 KfW, Member of the SME Advisory Council (since 2014)

Non-profit organizations
 Federal Foundation for the Reappraisal of the SED Dictatorship, Member of the Board of Trustees (since 2022)
 Business Forum of the Social Democratic Party of Germany, Member of the Political Advisory Board (since 2018)
   (BDU), Chairwoman of the Advisory Board (since 2014) 
  (GRS), Chairwoman of the Supervisory Board (since 2014) 
 University of Freiburg, Member of the Advisory Board

Political positions
In July 2015, following irregularities involving the reactor pressure vessel at the Beznau Nuclear Power Plant in Switzerland, near the German border, and near her parliamentary constituency, Schwarzelühr-Sutter demanded the final shutdown of the power plant, which is the oldest still operating nuclear power station in the world, having gone on line in 1964.

In January 2016, in response to an incident at the Leibstadt Nuclear Power Plant in Switzerland, near the German border, and near her parliamentary constituency, Schwarzelühr-Sutter criticized the operator's attitudes to safety.

See also
Third Merkel cabinet
List of Social Democratic Party of Germany members
Federal Ministry for the Environment, Nature Conservation, Building and Nuclear Safety
List of members of the 17th Bundestag

Notes

References

External links 
 Schwarzelühr-Sutter's SPD website
 Biography at the Federal Ministry of Environment
 Entry for Schwarzelühr-Sutter at the Bundestag website

1962 births
Living people
Federal government ministers of Germany
Members of the Bundestag for Baden-Württemberg
People from Waldshut-Tiengen
University of Zurich alumni
Female members of the Bundestag
Women federal government ministers of Germany
21st-century German women politicians
Members of the Bundestag 2021–2025
Members of the Bundestag 2017–2021
Members of the Bundestag 2013–2017
Members of the Bundestag 2009–2013
Members of the Bundestag 2005–2009
Members of the Bundestag for the Social Democratic Party of Germany
Parliamentary State Secretaries of Germany